The Gilder Lehrman Institute of American History was founded in New York City by businessmen-philanthropists Richard Gilder and Lewis E. Lehrman in 1994 to promote the study and interest in American history.

The Institute serves teachers, students, scholars, and the general public. Its activities include the following:

 creating history-centered schools;
 organizing seminars and programs for educators;
 producing print and electronic publications and traveling exhibitions;
 sponsoring lectures by eminent historians;
 administering a History Teacher of the Year Award in every state through its partnership with Preserve America;
 awarding the Gilder Lehrman Lincoln Prize, Frederick Douglass Book Prize, George Washington Prize, and the Gilder Lehrman Prize for Military History; 
 offering fellowships for scholars to work in the Gilder Lehrman Collection and other archives.

Website
The institute maintains a website  to offer educational material for teachers, students, historians, and the public, and to provide up-to-the-minute information about the institute's programs and activities. The Web site offers learning modules on major topics in American history, podcasts from noted historians discussing their work, online exhibitions of primary source documents, and information about the institute's programs.

Journal
The institute publishes a quarterly online history journal, History Now, featuring articles by historians, teacher lesson plans, interactive activities, and advice from the archivist.

The Gilder Lehrman Collection
The collection contains more than 60,000 documents on deposit at the New-York Historical Society detailing the political and social history of the United States. The collection's holdings include manuscript letters, diaries, maps, photographs, printed books and pamphlets, ranging from 1493 through modern times. It is particularly rich with materials in the Revolutionary, Antebellum, Civil War and Reconstruction periods.

Highlights of the collection include signed copies of the Emancipation Proclamation, the Thirteenth Amendment, a rare printed copy of the first draft of the Constitution, and thousands of unpublished Civil War soldiers' letters. Letters written by George Washington, Thomas Jefferson, Abraham Lincoln, Frederick Douglass et al. vividly record the issues and events of their day. The writings of such notable women as Lucy Knox, Mercy Otis Warren, and Catharine Macaulay discuss a variety of military, political, and social issues.

The Gilder Lehrman Center for the Study of Slavery, Resistance, and Abolition
The Gilder Lehrman Center for the Study of Slavery, Resistance, and Abolition was established at Yale University.

Prizes
In 1990 the $50,000 Gilder Lehrman Lincoln Prize was established by the institute and Gettysburg College.

In 1999 the $25,000 Frederick Douglass Book Prize was established by the institute.

In 2005 the $50,000 George Washington Book Prize was established by the institute, Washington College, and George Washington's Mount Vernon.

References

External links
 
 The Gilder Lehrman Institute of American History at Google Cultural Institute

American studies
Education in New York City
History organizations based in the United States
Educational organizations based in the United States
1994 establishments in New York City